() is a municipality and village in Frýdek-Místek District in the Moravian-Silesian Region of the Czech Republic. It has about 400 inhabitants.

Polish minority makes up 26.8% of the population.

Etymology
The name of the village is derived from the word koszarzysko / košor denoting a place where a koszar (movable fence to pen sheep used by Goral shepherds) was placed.

Geography
Košařiska lies in the historical region of Cieszyn Silesia, in the Moravian-Silesian Beskids mountain range. The Kopytná creek flows through the municipality.

History
The settlement of the area began around 1615. The first written mention of Košařiska is from 1657 as Kossarzyska. It belonged then to the Duchy of Teschen, a fee of the Kingdom of Bohemia and a part of the Habsburg monarchy.

After Revolutions of 1848 in the Austrian Empire a modern municipal division was introduced in the re-established Austrian Silesia. The village as a municipality was subscribed to the political district of Cieszyn and the legal district of Jablunkov. According to the censuses conducted in 1880–1910 the population of the municipality dropped from 480 in 1880 to 471 in 1910 with a majority being native Polish-speakers (between 96.8% and 100%) accompanied by German-speaking people (at most 15 or 3.2% in 1880). In terms of religion in 1910 the majority were Protestants (87.7%), followed by Roman Catholics (12.9%).

After World War I, Polish–Czechoslovak War and the division of Cieszyn Silesia in 1920, it became a part of Czechoslovakia. Following the Munich Agreement, in October 1938 together with the Zaolzie region it was annexed by Poland, administratively adjoined to Cieszyn County of Silesian Voivodeship. It was then annexed by Nazi Germany at the beginning of World War II. After the war it was restored to Czechoslovakia.

Twin towns – sister cities

Košařiska is twinned with:
 Dunajov, Slovakia
 Rajcza, Poland

References

External links

 

Villages in Frýdek-Místek District
Cieszyn Silesia